Phir Subah Hogi (Also spelled Phir Subha Hogi;  Morning will dawn again) is a 1958 Indian Hindi-language drama film produced and directed by Ramesh Saigal. It stars Raj Kapoor, Mala Sinha, Rehman in lead roles. The film is an adaption of Fyodor Dostoevsky's novel Crime and Punishment.

It was the fourth highest-grossing film in India of 1958 and was declared as a "Hit" at  Box Office India.

Plot 
Ram (Raj Kapoor) is a poor law student who supports his education with money orders from his mother and things he pawns. While struggling with his poor finances, he save a boy from an accident. Seeing the poor condition of the boy's family, he gives all his savings for the boy's treatment. Ram keeps visiting the boy and falls in love with the boy's elder sister Soni (Mala Sinha). Soni's father Gopal (Nana Palsikar) is addicted to alcohol, which Harbanslal (Jagdish Sethi) keeps providing him with. Harbanslal has a mean motive in doing so as he wants marry Soni. To prevent Soni's arranged marriage with Harbanslal, Ram decides to rob the pawn broker, but he is caught in the act and he murders the pawn owner.

Ram's conscience keeps telling him to admit to his crime, but he never picks up the courage to do so. The police inspector on the case keeps suspecting Ram for the crime. With no proof he, too, is helpless. Ram learns that the police have already arrested another thief and have charged him with this robbery and murder. On the last day, when the court is to rule in the case, Ram makes up his mind and admits. He pleads saying how he was acting in self-defense against real villains of the society. The court sentences him to three years of imprisonment. Soni promises that she will wait for his release and then marry him.

Cast 
 Raj Kapoor as Ram 
 Mala Sinha as Soni
 Rehman as Rehman
 Mubarak as Police Inspector
 Jagdish Sethi as Harbanslal
 Nana Palsikar as Gopal
 Leela Chitnis as Soni's Mother
 Tun Tun as Ram's Landlord
 Kamal Kapoor as Soni's Molester

Music 
Lyrics for this socially relevant film were composed by Sahir Ludhianvi and music by Khayyam. The song "Chin-O-Arab Hamara, Hindustan Hamara, Rehne Ko Ghar Nahin Hain, Sara Jahan Hamara" sung by Mukesh and picturised on Raj Kapoor, became very popular yet controversial, and was very close to being banned then.

Reception 
Phir Subah Hogi fared successfully at the box office and was the fourth highest-grossing film of the year 1958 behind Madhumati, Chalti Ka Naam Gaadi and Yahudi. The music composed by Khayyam is considered as "rich and beautiful". Songs like "Chin-O-Arab Hamara" and "Woh Subah Kabhi To Aayegi" penned by Sahir Ludhianvi were satirical on the condition of India and the Nehruvian politics. "Chin-o-Arab Hamara" was a parody on Iqbal's poem "Tarana-e-Milli".

Trivia 
Lal Krishna Advani, a senior leader of "Bharatiya Janata Party", many a time in his speeches has talked about watching this movie along with his friend and colleague Atal Bihari Vajpayee. Advani reminisces that former prime minister Atal Bihari Vajpayee was very fond of watching movies. He narrated an incident where in 1958 he and Vajpayee, after facing an electoral defeat in Delhi Municipal Corporation election, straightaway went to watch a movie.
Advani says that the film turned out to be Phir Subah Hogi. Advani says that after Vajpayee became PM, he told party workers that the title of the movie had turned out to be prophetic and there was finally a dawn.

References

External links 
 

1958 films
1950s Hindi-language films
1958 romantic drama films
Indian romantic drama films
Films scored by Khayyam
Films directed by Ramesh Saigal